Miss USA 1988 was the 37th Miss USA pageant, televised live from the El Paso Civic Center in El Paso, Texas on March 1, 1988.  At the conclusion of the final competition, Courtney Gibbs of Texas was crowned Miss USA, becoming the fourth consecutive winner from Texas.  

The pageant was hosted by Growing Pains star Alan Thicke, the first time in twenty years that Bob Barker did not host, and the pageant commentator was Tracy Scoggins.  Barker, an animal rights activist, refused to be involved because one of the winner's prizes was a fur coat.  There had been controversy surrounding the fur coats since the previous year, and Barker claimed he had asked pageant officials not to give away coats for years but that he had been ignored.  Other animal rights activists threatened to picket the pageant in protest at its fur policy and disrupted a pre-pageant press conference.  In an unrelated attack, Scoggins was attacked in an elevator following pageant rehearsals.  The attacker was charged with attempted sexual assault.  

This was the first time that the pageant was held in Texas and the only time it was ever held in El Paso.  El Paso had hosted the Miss Teen USA 1987 pageant the previous year, and it was announced in November 1987 that the city would likely host Miss USA 1988.

Results

Placements

Special awards

Final competition

 Winner 
 First Runner-up
 Second Runner-up 
 Third Runner-up
 Fourth Runner-up
 Top 10 Semifinalist
(#)  Rank in each round of competition

Preliminary swimsuit scores
The following is the contestants average scores in the Preliminary swimsuit competition.

 Winner 
 First Runner-up
 Second Runner-up 
 Third Runner-up
 Fourth Runner-up
 Top 10 Semifinalist

Historical significance 
 Texas wins competition for the fifth time and fourth in a row. 
 California earns the 1st runner-up position for the third time. The last time it placed this was in 1967. Also it reaches the highest placement since Julie Hayek won Miss USA 1983.
 Georgia earns the 2nd runner-up position for the second time. The last time it placed this was in 1986.
 Florida earns the 3rd runner-up position for the third time. The last time it placed this was in 1975.
 Mississippi earns the 4th runner-up position for the second time. The last time it placed this was in 1979.
 States that placed in semifinals the previous year were Florida, Georgia, Illinois, Mississippi and Texas.
 Texas placed for the fourteenth consecutive year.
 Illinois placed for the fifth consecutive year. 
 Georgia and Mississippi placed for the third consecutive year. 
 Florida made its second consecutive placement.
 California, Oklahoma and South Carolina last placed in 1986.
 Tennessee last placed in 1984.
 Maryland last placed in 1982.

Delegates
The Miss USA 1988 delegates were:

 Alabama - Rhonda Mooney
 Alaska - Raun Reaves
 Arizona - Kris Keim
 Arkansas - Melissa Staples
 California - Diana Magaña
 Colorado - Nicola Svaldi
 Connecticut - Catherine Calasso
 Delaware - Christina lee Angel
 District of Columbia - Elva Anderson
 Florida - Monica Farrell
 Georgia - Donna Rampy
 Hawaii - Paula Prevost
 Idaho - Kay Kinsey
 Illinois - Gina Zordani
 Indiana - Loetta Earnest
 Iowa - Julie Kemmerling
 Kansas - Cynthia Decker
 Kentucky - Suzanne Pitman
 Louisiana - Rhonda Vinson
 Maine - Suzanne Grenier
 Maryland - Rowanne Brewer
 Massachusetts - Ania Lovely
 Michigan - Anthonia Dotson
 Minnesota - Julie Nelson
 Mississippi - Dana Richmond
 Missouri - Alecia Workman
 Montana - Kimberly Topp
 Nebraska - Kellie O'Neil
 Nevada - Lagracella Omran
 New Hampshire - Diane Wright
 New Jersey - Colleen Carlone
 New Mexico - Stephanie Storrie
 New York - Linnea Mancini
 North Carolina - Tammy Tolar
 North Dakota - Kate Sevde
 Ohio - Gina West
 Oklahoma - Tamara Walker
 Oregon - Elaine Rohrer
 Pennsylvania - Susan Gray
 Rhode Island - Cindy Geronda
 South Carolina - April Abel
 South Dakota - Sandi Fix
 Tennessee - Stephanie Jane Potts
 Texas - Courtney Gibbs
 Utah - Suzie Lundell
 Vermont - Stacy Sisson
 Virginia - Denise Smith
 Washington - Sandra Kord
 West Virginia -  Cathy Fowler
 Wisconsin -  Mary Kay Anderson
 Wyoming - Kristen Youmans

Contestant notes
Two contestants had previously competed in the Miss Teen USA pageant.  They were Kris Keim (Arizona), who was Miss Arizona Teen USA 1983, and Melissa Staples (Arkansas), who was Miss Arkansas Teen USA 1984
Two contestants had previously competed in the Miss America 1986 pageant.  They were Mary Kay Anderson (Wisconsin), formerly Miss Wisconsin 1985 and Monica Farrell (Florida), formerly Miss Florida 1985.
Prior to the pageant Suzanne Pitman (Kentucky) was arrested on a drunk-driving charge but allowed to compete in the pageant.
Miss Minnesota USA winner Sue Bolich resigned her title one week after she was arrested for shoplifting.  The other pageant contestants were already in El Paso at the time of her resignation, and first runner-up Jolene Stavrakis was to be sent in Bolich's place.  However, Stavrakis also had a previous shoplifting charge on her record, and she too withdrew from the pageant.  Julie Nelson, second runner-up in the state pageant, assumed the title and represented Minnesota at Miss USA.

Judges
Jennifer Ashe
Mary Kay Ash
Michelle Butin
Gil Gerard
Albert Hague
Sharlene Wells Hawkes
Michael K. Herbert
Stanley Platos

References

External links
Official website

1988
1988 beauty pageants
1988 in Texas
1988
El Paso, Texas
March 1988 events in the United States